Kedushah may refer to:

 Holiness in Judaism
 Kedushah (prayer)